Norwegian Gem is a  of Norwegian Cruise Line (NCL). She is the final cruise ship of the Jewel class and was built by German shipbuilder Meyer Werft.

History
Norwegian Gem was the newest cruise ship in Norwegian Cruise Line's fleet until the debut of Norwegian Epic in June 2010.  Construction began on 7 June 2006 at the Meyer Werft Shipyard of Papenburg, Germany.  She was delivered to NCL on 1 October 2007. NCL promoted the launch of this ship via her own website, "Gem It Girl", which in addition to providing details about the ship, also prompted previous customers' of NCL to submit an entry to be chosen as her godmother.

On 29 October 2011, Norwegian Gem rescued five people from the  sailboat Sanctuary which had lost power and was floating in extreme weather conditions in the Atlantic.

Vessel class
Norwegian Gem is the fourth of Norwegian's Jewel class. Each ship has different amenities, but has a similar exterior and interior design.

The interior design and amenities, however, are significantly different and merit Norwegian Gem a Jewel class designation.

Areas of operation
Norwegian Gem has undertaken regional cruises from ports in North America and Europe.

Incidents and accidents

2018 blizzard 
On 4 January 2018, Norwegian Gem traveled southbound passing the Norwegian Breakaway through the January 2018 North American blizzard causing major flooding in passenger staterooms.

COVID-19 pandemic 

On 13 April 2020, a 56-year-old Filipino male crew member died aboard Norwegian Gem.  The crew member had been treated for pneumonia and tachycardia arrhythmia.  NCL claimed they did not believe he was infected with SARS-CoV-2, but appeared to have not offered any explanation as to why an autopsy was not performed, or why he was not tested for the virus.  He was disembarked at Miami by people in hazmat suits.

On 23 April, NCL sent a letter to the crew members aboard stating that another crew member, who was on the cruise ship between 31 March and 14 April, had tested positive for the virus.  Notably, this letter was not sent to crew members who were no longer on the ship.

On the morning of 30 April, the senior doctor on Norwegian Gem was found dead in his cabin.  NCL claimed that he died of a heart attack in his sleep, though crew members stated that he was being treated for pneumonia and had not been tested for the virus.  Also, according to crew members, a nurse who had worked closely with the doctor had reportedly tested positive for the virus after being removed from the ship.

There was concern among crew members that NCL had been hiding evidence of the virus on board Norwegian Gem, which may become an issue if NCL carries out plans to combine crews from different ships together before sailing them back home.

In July 2021, the cruise line filed a lawsuit against the surgeon general of Florida, Scott Rivkees, for forbidding the requirement from private businesses for a proof of Covid-19 vaccination. The suit is primarily against the statewide measure allowing the state to fine businesses up to $5,000 for each instance of requiring a proof of vaccination for admittance or entry into the establishment. The company argued that the prevention of vaccine documentation is in effect a violation of the freedom of speech secured by the first amendment by way of "restricting the flow of information", according to the Wall Street Journal.

Notes

References

External links

 NCL Norwegian Gem 
 Meyer Werft
 Photos of Norwegian Gem

Passenger ships of Norway
Ships of Norwegian Cruise Line
Ships built in Papenburg
2007 ships